In mathematics, an involutory matrix is a square matrix that is its own inverse. That is, multiplication by the matrix A is an involution if and only if A2 = I, where I is the n × n identity matrix. Involutory matrices are all square roots of the identity matrix. This is simply a consequence of the fact that any nonsingular matrix multiplied by its inverse is the identity.

Examples
The 2 × 2 real matrix  is involutory provided that 

The Pauli matrices in M(2, C) are involutory:

One of the three classes of elementary matrix is involutory, namely the row-interchange elementary matrix. A special case of another class of elementary matrix, that which represents multiplication of a row or column by −1, is also involutory; it is in fact a trivial example of a signature matrix, all of which are involutory.

Some simple examples of involutory matrices are shown below.

where
I is the 3 × 3 identity matrix (which is trivially involutory);
R is the 3 × 3 identity matrix with a pair of interchanged rows;
S is a signature matrix.

Any block-diagonal matrices constructed from involutory matrices will also be involutory, as a consequence of the linear independence of the blocks.

Symmetry
An involutory matrix which is also symmetric is an orthogonal matrix, and thus represents an isometry (a linear transformation which preserves Euclidean distance). Conversely every orthogonal involutory matrix is symmetric.
As a special case of this, every reflection and 180° rotation matrix is involutory.

Properties
An involution is non-defective, and each eigenvalue equals , so an involution diagonalizes to a signature matrix.

A normal involution is Hermitian (complex) or symmetric (real) and also unitary (complex) or orthogonal (real).

The determinant of an involutory matrix over any field is ±1.

If A is an n × n matrix, then A is involutory if and only if P+ = (I + A)/2 is idempotent. This relation gives a bijection between involutory matrices and idempotent matrices. Similarly, A is involutory if and only if P− = (I - A)/2 is idempotent. The same construct applies to any involutory function, such as the complex conjugate (real and imaginary parts), transpose (symmetric and antisymetric matrices), and Hermitian adjoint (Hermitian and skew-Hermitian matrices).

If A is an involutory matrix in M(n, R), a matrix algebra over the real numbers, then the subalgebra {x I + y A: x, y ∈ R} generated by A is isomorphic to the split-complex numbers.

If A and B are two involutory matrices which commute with each other (i.e. AB = BA) then AB is also involutory.

If A is an involutory matrix then every integer power of A is involutory. In fact, An will be equal to A if n is odd and I if n is even.

See also
Affine involution

References

Matrices